Jacques Lanctôt is a Canadian writer, publisher, terrorist, and restaurateur.
He was a member of the Front de libération du Québec (FLQ) and was convicted on terrorism charges for his role in the kidnapping of British diplomat James Cross in October 1970. Lanctôt is the son of Gérard Lanctôt, a former head of the Parti de l'Unité nationale du Canada, a fascist party promoting Canadian nationalism.

After Cross was released, Lanctôt and the other kidnappers were allowed to leave Canada. Lanctôt later returned to Canada in 1979, and served two years in prison. Following his release he set up a publishing house.

He is currently a columnist for the Quebecois francophone news service Canoe.ca.

References

Canadian book publishers (people)
1945 births
Living people
Writers from Montreal
Liberation Cell members
Canadian people convicted of kidnapping
Quebec sovereigntists